Pseudosphex humilis is a moth of the subfamily Arctiinae. It was described by Gottlieb August Wilhelm Herrich-Schäffer in 1855. It is found in Brazil.

References

Pseudosphex
Moths described in 1854